The , also known as the , was a military development laboratory run by the Imperial Japanese Army from 1937 to 1945. The lab, based in the Noborito neighborhood of Tama-ku, Kawasaki, Kanagawa Prefecture, was originally founded in 1927 as the Shinoda Research Section, a division of the Army Science Research Institute under Captain Shinoda Ryo. The laboratory was focused on clandestine activities and unconventional warfare, including energy weapons, intelligence and spycraft, chemical and biological weapons, poisons, and currency counterfeiting.

History 
One of the weapons developed by the lab was the fire balloon, thousands of which were launched against the United States in 1944 and 1945. In addition, the laboratory researched nuclear weapons, biological warfare, chemical weapons, and suicide weapons among other projects. In its project Operation Sugi, the Noborito Laboratory made 4 billion yen worth of counterfeit Chinese currency to damage the Chinese economy. 

The laboratory, which at its peak was staffed by 1,000 scientists and workers, was disbanded upon Japan's defeat at the end of the war.

According to a 2007 book review in the CIA journal Studies in Intelligence, "Ban Shigeo, a technician at the Japanese Army's 9th Technical Research Institute, left a rare and valuable account" of his work at the Number Nine Research Laboratory, which was published posthumously in 2001 as Rikugun Noborito Kenkyujo no shinjitsu [The Truth About the Army Noborito Research Institute]. According to this review, "the US Army quietly enlisted certain members of Noborito in its efforts against the communist camp in the early years of the Cold War.... Ban led the 'chemical section' of a US clandestine unit hidden within Yokosuka naval base during the Korean War...."

On 7 April 2010, a museum called the Defunct Imperial Japanese Army Noborito Laboratory Museum for Education in Peace opened at the lab's former site. Located on the Ikuta campus of Meiji University, the museum exhibits artifacts from the lab and gives information on the unit's mission and operations.

See also
Iwakuro Hideo, Major general in the Imperial Japanese Army during World War II, also founder of the Kyoto Sangyo University. 
Sadamichi Hirasawa, a mass murderer who is suspected of having used a poison created at the Noborito Laboratory.

References

External links

External links 
The defunct Imperial Japanese Army Noborito Laboratory Museum for Education in Peace Official Website

Biological warfare facilities
Imperial Japanese Army
Military history of Japan during World War II
Second Sino-Japanese War
Japan
Museums in Kanagawa Prefecture
Buildings and structures in Kawasaki, Kanagawa
History of Kanagawa Prefecture
World War II sites in Japan
Weapon development
Japanese biological weapons program
Counterfeit money